The Belinul Mare is a right tributary of the river Olt in Romania. It flows into the Olt in Belin.

References

Rivers of Romania
Rivers of Covasna County